Cascade Station is a mixed-use development of a shopping center, office buildings, and hotels located in Northeast Portland, Oregon along Airport Way and I-205, near Portland International Airport.

Cascade Station was proposed in 2001.  Because of the timing of the project's announcement (September 10, 2001) and the recession that followed, the project stalled for several years and the streets built for it remained mostly empty.  In 2005, IKEA signed on as the shopping center's first tenant giving the project the boost it needed for construction to begin.  The  IKEA store opened on July 25, 2007.

See also
List of shopping malls in Oregon
Cascades (MAX station)
Mount Hood Avenue (MAX station)

References

External links

Official website
Portland Development Commission Fact Sheet

Shopping centers in Portland, Oregon
Shopping malls established in 2007
2007 establishments in Oregon
Northeast Portland, Oregon